The Tempest is a trailerable, one-design racing sailboat that was designed by British naval architect Ian Proctor and first built in 1965.

Production
In the past the design was built by O'Day Corp. and Plastrend/Composite Technologies in the United States and by Lanaverre in France. A total of 850 boats had been reported as built by 1994. Today it is built by Mader Bootswerft of Germany and remains in production.

Design

The Tempest is a racing keelboat, built predominantly of fiberglass, with wood trim. It has a fractional sloop rig with aluminum spars. The hull has a spooned raked stem, a plumb transom, an internally mounted spade-type rudder controlled by a tiller and a lifting, weighted, bulb keel. It displaces  and carries  of lead keel ballast. Construction includes three transverse bulkheads to aid flotation. The boat has a rear deck above the rudder.

For sailing the design is equipped with a single trapeze, an unusual feature on a keelboat. Jib and mainsail windows for visibility are permitted in the class rules, but the sizes are controlled.

The design has a Portsmouth Yardstick DP-N racing average handicap of 83.4 and an RYA-PN of 942. It is normally raced with a crew of two sailors.

Operational history
The boat was selected as an Olympic class and raced at the 1972 and the 1976 Summer Olympics.

The boat is supported by an active class club that organizes racing events, the International Tempest Class Association.

In a 1994 review Richard Sherwood wrote, "the International Class Tempest was an Olympic boat in 1972 and 1976. She is fast. Tempest is a one-design, and class rules are strict ... The mast’s design and material are optional, but the mast may not rotate. Older boats have thicker, stiffer masts and, in addition to the diamond shrouds and spreaders found today, additional swept-back spreaders. Good racing boats are light at the ends and rigid, although this is not necessary in the deck ... Only one person may use the trapeze, and safety equipment is required."

Racing

See also
List of sailing boat types

References

External links

 Manufacturer's official website

 
Classes of World Sailing
Olympic sailing classes
1960s sailboat type designs
Boats designed by Ian Proctor
Sailing yachts
Two-person sailboats
Trailer sailers
Sailboat types built by O'Day Corp.
Sailboat types built by Mader Bootswerft
Sailboat types built by Lanaverre
Sailboat types built by Plastrend/Composite Technologies
One-design sailing classes